Villanueva de Oscos (Eonavian: Vilanova d'Ozcos) is a municipality in the Autonomous Community of the Principality of Asturias, Spain. It is bordered on the north by Vegadeo and Castropol, on the south by San Martín de Oscos and Santa Eulalia de Oscos, on the east by Illano and San Martín, and on the west by Taramundi.

The medieval Monastery of Santa María de Villanueva de Oscos is located there.

Population 
From:INE Archiv

Parishes
San José Gestoso
Martul
San Cristóbal
Villanueva

References

External links
Federación Asturiana de Concejos 
Guía del Occidente. Villanueva de Oscos 

Municipalities in Asturias